Chengdu East or Chengdudong railway station is a railway station in Chenghua District, Chengdu, the capital of Sichuan province, serving the Chengdu–Chongqing intercity railway, the Chengdu–Guiyang high-speed railway, the Dazhou–Chengdu railway and Xi'an–Chengdu high-speed railway. It is connected to Chengdu Metro Line 2 and Line 7.

History
Construction began on December 29, 2008.

Station structure

Layout
Chengdu East Railway Station is divided into two spaces, the station building and outdoor squares, with a total area of about 68 hectares, the station building itself has an area of 108,000 square meters. The main building of the station is divided into five main levels, including an elevated Waiting Hall level (with mezzanine eating areas and shopping), Platform Level (Ground Level), Arrivals Level and two levels of Chengdu Metro lines. Total investment for its construction was set at about 3.83 billion yuan in 2011 when it was put into use. The station exterior design features a fusion of Jinsha and Sanxingdui bronze shape artistic elements of the ancient Shu culture. Beneath the outdoor squares, substantial car parking and a bus terminal is housed. Passengers enter the station across the outdoor Square or direct access to the station building from two north-south elevated roads. Ticket offices exist in the top Waiting Hall area and beneath in the Arrivals Hall.

Track layout
The station has 14 platforms and 26 tracks, all of which are covered. The departures Waiting Hall sits above the platforms, with arrivals descending down to the Arrivals Hall level below the platforms.

Connections

Chengdu East Railway Station is a terminus of the Chengdu–Chongqing Railway, Chengdu–Kunming Railway and Dazhou–Chengdu Railway.

Chengdu Metro

East Chengdu Railway Station is a transfer station on Line 2 and Line 7 of the Chengdu Metro. It serves the Chengdu East railway station.

Gallery

See also
Chengdu railway station
Chengdu Metro

References

External links 
 

Railway stations in Sichuan
Buildings and structures in Chengdu
Chengdu Metro stations
Stations on the Chengdu–Chongqing Intercity Railway
Transport in Chengdu